San Luis del Carmen is a municipality in the Chalatenango department of El Salvador.

References

External links

Municipalities of the Chalatenango Department